Soldati e capelloni is a 1967 Italian "musicarello" comedy film directed by Ettore Maria Fizzarotti, written by Augusto Caminito and Giovanni Grimaldi, produced by Franco Cittadini and Stenio Fiorentini and starred by Franco Lantieri, Brizio Montinari, Peppino de Filippo, Lia Zoppelli, Valeria Fabrizi, Patrizia Valturri, Valentino Macchi and Franco Giacobini.

Cast

References

External links
 

1967 films
Italian comedy films
Musicarelli
1960s black comedy films
Films directed by Ettore Maria Fizzarotti
Films with screenplays by Giovanni Grimaldi
Films scored by Gianfranco Reverberi
1967 comedy films
1967 drama films
1960s Italian films